The Hospital Sírio-Libanês (Syrian-Lebanese Hospital) is one of the most important hospitals in Brazil and South America. The hospital was founded by the large Syrian and Lebanese community of São Paulo in 1921. It is one of the most well-known health facilities in Brazil due to the high quality of care.

Complex 
The main complex is located in the Bela Vista district, next to Paulista Avenue, central zone. Other units are located in Itaim Bibi and Jardins both in São Paulo and an oncology unit found in the Brazilian capital Brasilia

The hospital is divided into various units:
Bela Vista, São Paulo - Hospital complex, including hospitalization units, surgical center, diagnostic center and emergencies.
Itaim Bibi, São Paulo - Diagnostics center, day hospital, health accompaniment center and check-up center, human reproduction center and vein treatment center.
Jardins, São Paulo - Attention unit.
Brasilia - Oncology center.

On 1 July 2010, the hospital was visited by Syrian president Bashar al-Assad and his wife Asma al-Assad during their official visit to Brazil, awarding its director Dr. Riad Younis with the Syrian Order of Merit.

See also
 List of hospitals in Brazil

References

sirio
Hospitals established in 1921
1921 establishments in Brazil
Lebanese Brazilian